

Events

January
 January 1 – The Chicago and North Western Railway leases the Chicago, St. Paul, Minneapolis and Omaha Railway (the Omaha Road).
 January 12 – Operations of the Atchison, Topeka & Santa Fe Railway's Super Chief and El Capitan passenger trains are combined during off-peak seasons.
 January 22 – Last day of steam locomotive operations on the Southern Pacific.

February 
 February 7 – Southern Pacific 4-6-2 #2472 (now preserved) is retired from revenue service.

March
 March 17 – The Milwaukee Road operates its last steam locomotive.
 March 21 – Deutsche Bundesbahn puts in operation its first E 40 locomotive.
 March 29 – The New York, Ontario & Western Railway is abandoned, the largest single railroad abandonment in the United States.
 March 29 – The Central Vermont Railway dieselizes.

April
 April 7 – New York City trolleys run for the last time.

May
 May 7 – The Flying Yankee trainset is retired from revenue service on the Boston & Maine and Maine Central railroads.
 May 17 – Canadian National opens a new track alignment between Toronto and Montreal to make way for construction of the St Lawrence Seaway.
 May 24 – The Pacific Electric Bellflower Line ceases operation.

June
 June 2 – First Trans Europ Express diesel trains run in Europe.
 June 6 – Pere Marquette Railroad steam locomotive 2-8-4 number 1225 is given to Michigan State University for display on campus.

July 
 July 3 – The Chicago Aurora and Elgin Railroad abruptly ceases to carry passengers at 12:13pm.
 July 11 – Southern Pacific's Colton Cutoff around Los Angeles is opened to traffic.
 July 27 – The Musquodoboit Railway ends steam locomotive operations with a round trip between Dartmouth and Upper Upper Musquodoboit, Nova Scotia, behind Canadian National number 3409.

August
 August 27 – The Atchison, Topeka & Santa Fe Railway retires its last steam locomotive.

September
 September 1 – 175 die in Jamaica's worst railway disaster.
 September 7 – The Pennsylvania Railroad discontinues the Morning Steeler passenger train between Pittsburgh and Cleveland.
 September 28 – Newtown Tram Depot in Sydney is closed.

October 
 October 6 – The Chicago "L" Stock Yards branch serving Union Stock Yards is closed.
 October 21 – Two trains collide in Turkey; 95 die.
 October 31 – Canadian National receives authorization to operate the former New York Central Railroad (NYC) lines in Ottawa to reach industries that were originally served by NYC.

November
 November 1 – Class I railroads report they roster 27,108 diesel and 2,697 steam locomotives. An additional 721 steam locomotives are in storage.
 November 15 – A first section of Nagoya Municipal Subway, Nagoya Station to Sakae Station route start operation in Aichi Prefecture, Japan.

Unknown date
 William N. Deramus III becomes president of the Missouri–Kansas–Texas Railroad.
 Estación Federico Lacroze in Buenos Aires, Argentina, opens.
 The California State Legislature establishes the five-county San Francisco Bay Area Rapid Transit District.
 Pandrol clip patented by Norwegian railway engineer Per Pande Rolfsen.

Accidents

Deaths

March deaths 
 March 9 – Robert Whitelegg, locomotive superintendent for London, Tilbury and Southend Railway 1910-1912, and for Glasgow & South Western Railway 1918-1923, general manager of Beyer, Peacock & Company 1923-1929, dies (b. 1871).

July deaths 
 July 13 - Sim Webb, Casey Jones' fireman on the famous run (born 1874).

References
 Colin Churcher's Railway Pages (September 7, 2005), Significant dates in Ottawa railway history. Retrieved October 31, 2005.
 Katy Railroad Historical Society, Katy Frequently Asked Questions. Retrieved February 9, 2005.
 Smith, Ivan (1998), Significant Dates in Nova Scotia's Railway History (After 1950). Retrieved July 22, 2005.